Rockville Historic District is a national historic district located at Rockville, Parke County, Indiana.  The district encompasses 210 contributing buildings, 3 contributing structures, and 1 contributing object in the central business district and surrounding residential sections of Rockville.  It developed between about 1826 and 1942, and includes notable examples of Italianate, Colonial Revival, and Queen Anne style architecture. Notable contributing resources include the Parke County Courthouse (1882), Memorial Presbyterian Church (1891), Sheriff' Residence and Jail, U.S. Post Office (1938), Rockville Public Library (1916), Methodist Episcopal Church (1862, 1892, 1909), Rockville Grade School (1941), Parke County Seminary (1839), Rockville Opera House (1912), First National Bank (1907), Judge Samuel Maxwell House (c. 1830), Dr. P.Q. Stryker House (1838), Dr. Harrison J. Rice House (1880), and Dr. Marion Goss House (1907).

It was listed on the National Register of Historic Places in 1993.

References

Historic districts on the National Register of Historic Places in Indiana
Colonial Revival architecture in Indiana
Italianate architecture in Indiana
Queen Anne architecture in Indiana
Buildings and structures in Parke County, Indiana
National Register of Historic Places in Parke County, Indiana